Stigmella ficulnea is a moth of the family Nepticulidae. It is found in Turkmenistan.

The larvae feed on Ficus carica. They probably mine the leaves of their host.

External links
Revised Check-List Of Mining Lepidoptera (Nepticuloidea, Tischerioidea And Gracillarioidea) From Central Asia

Nepticulidae
Moths described in 1994
Endemic fauna of Turkmenistan
Moths of Asia